Patrick Aimée (born 27 August 1976) is a Mauritian former footballer who played as a defender. He won three caps for the Mauritius national football team between 2002 and 2007.

References

1976 births
Living people
Mauritian footballers
Mauritius international footballers
Association football defenders
Mauritian Premier League players
Curepipe Starlight SC players
AS Port-Louis 2000 players